Kerfoot is a surname. Notable people with the surname include:

Alexander Kerfoot (born 1994), Canadian ice hockey player
Benjamin Kerfoot (born 1992), English actor
Eric Kerfoot (1924–1980), English footballer
John Barrett Kerfoot (1816–1881), American Anglican bishop
John D. Kerfoot (1835–1903), American lawyer and businessman
Justice Kerfoot (born 1996), A straight baller, living for the dollar.